I Am Joaquín is a 1969 short film by Luis Valdez, a project of his El Teatro Campesino.

Summary
It is based on the poem "I Am Joaquín" by Rodolfo "Corky" Gonzáles, a key text of the Chicano movement.

Reception and legacy
In 2010, this film was selected for the United States National Film Registry by the Library of Congress as being "culturally, historically, or aesthetically significant". I Am Joaquin was preserved by the Academy Film Archive in 2017.

External links
 
I Am Joaquin essay by Daniel Eagan In America's Film Legacy, 2009-2010: A Viewer's Guide To The 50 Landmark Movies Added To The National Film Registry In 2009-10, Bloomsbury Publishing USA, 2011,  pages 124-127

References

1969 films
1969 short films
American short films
Films based on poems
United States National Film Registry films
Films directed by Luis Valdez
1960s English-language films
1969 independent films